Shaun Kauleinamoku (born May 24, 1987) is an arena football wide receiver for the Shanghai Skywalkers of the China Arena Football League. He played collegiately at Western Oregon University. Kauleinamoku has also been member of the Spokane Shock, San Antonio Talons, Utah Blaze, Pittsburgh Power and Shanghai Skywalkers.

Professional career

Philadelphia Soul
On January 26, 2015, Kauleinamoku was assigned to the Philadelphia Soul. On January 26, 2016, Kauleinamoku was assigned to the Soul for the 2016 season. On August 26, 2016, the Soul beat the Arizona Rattlers in ArenaBowl XXIX by a score of 56–42 and Kauleinamoku was named ArenaBowl MVP. He earned Second Team All-Arena honors in 2017. On August 26, 2017, the Soul beat the Tampa Bay Storm in ArenaBowl XXX by a score of 44–40.

Shanghai Skywalkers
Kauleinamoku was drafted by the Shanghai Skywalkers in the fourth round of the 2016 CAFL Draft. He earned All-Pro South Division All-Star honors after catching 37 passes for 479 yards and 16 touchdowns. He also rushed for 71 yards and 4 touchdowns. He is listed on the Skywalkers' roster for the 2018 season.

AFL statistics

Stats from ArenaFan:

Coaching career
Kauleinamoku was an assistant coach for the Western Oregon Wolves in 2013.

References

External links
 Arena Football bio
 

1987 births
Living people
American football wide receivers
Western Oregon Wolves football players
Spokane Shock players
San Antonio Talons players
Utah Blaze players
Pittsburgh Power players
Philadelphia Soul players
Shanghai Skywalkers players
Western Oregon Wolves football coaches
Players of American football from Hawaii
Native Hawaiian people